Michael Roland Daniel (born April 13, 1940) served as the 84th Lieutenant Governor of South Carolina. He served from 1983 to 1987 concurrently with his fellow Democrat, Governor Richard Riley.

Biography 
Daniel was educated at the University of South Carolina, where he was a member of the Euphradian Society and graduated in 1962 with a B.A. in Journalism.  He graduated from the USC School of Law in 1965.

To win the Democratic runoff election for lieutenant governor, Daniel defeated State Senator Tom Turnipseed, a lawyer from Columbia, who had renounced his opposition to school integration.
 
Daniel lost the race for governor in 1986 to Republican Carroll Campbell.

References

Lieutenant Governors of South Carolina
South Carolina Democrats
1940 births
Living people
People from Gaffney, South Carolina
University of South Carolina alumni